Selamat Datang Monument (Selamat Datang is Indonesian for "Welcome"), also known as the Monumen Bundaran HI or Monumen Bunderan HI ( for 'Hotel Indonesia roundabout'), is a monument located in Central Jakarta, Indonesia. Completed in 1962 by sculptor Edhi Sunarso, the Selamat Datang Monument is one of the historic landmarks of Jakarta.

History and design

During the 1960s, President Sukarno ordered several constructions and city beautification projects in preparation for the Asian Games IV. These activities included the construction of the Ikada Sport Complex (in what is now Gelora Bung Karno Sport Complex) and several statues, including the Selamat Datang Monument, designated as Tugu Selamat Datang.

The design of the statue was sketched by Henk Ngantung, at that time the vice governor of Jakarta. The sculpting of the statue was done by sculptor Edhi Sunarso. , a close advisor to Sukarno on fine arts matters, was the coordinator of the project. The statue depicts two bronze statues of a man and a woman, waving in a welcoming gesture. The woman holds a flower bouquet in her left hand. The design evokes similarity with the style of Soviet sculptor Vera Mukhina and was heavy with socialist realism. Sukarno was said to have contributed to the design of the statue. Henk Ngantung wrote that initially the Welcome Monument was to be named "Indonesian people greet their future".

The two figures of the Welcome Monument are five metres from head to toe, or seven metres from the tip of the raised arm to toe. The two figures stand atop a pedestal. In total, the monument is about thirty meters above the ground. The Selamat Datang Monument symbolizes the openness of the Indonesian nation to visitors to the Asian Games IV.

The construction of the statue was started on August 17, 1961. During the construction of the statue, Edhi Sunarso was visited by Sukarno, US Ambassador to Indonesia Howard P. Jones, and other ministers in his studio.

Bundaran Hotel Indonesia

The Selamat Datang Monument is located in the center of a roundabout known as Bundaran Hotel Indonesia or Bundaran HI (Indonesian for "Hotel Indonesia Roundabout"). It is so named because of its proximity to Hotel Indonesia. Other accepted spelling is Bunderan HI, which is closer to local Javanese-Betawi language unique to Jakarta. The roundabout is strategically located in the heart of Jakarta, right in the center of Jakarta's main avenue, Jalan M.H. Thamrin, on its intersection with Jalan Imam Bonjol, Jalan Sutan Syahrir and Jalan Kebon Kacang. At its completion, Hotel Indonesia and its roundabout is the gateway for visitors of Jakarta. The roundabout features a round pond with fountains.

In 2002, Bundaran Hotel Indonesia was restored by PT Jaya Konstruksi Manggala Pratama. The restoration introduced new fountains, new design of the pool, and new lighting. Today after the reformation era, the paved plaza surrounds the pond has become a popular spot for civic demonstrations. Every Sunday morning during Jakarta's Car-Free Days, the roundabout is filled with people doing jogging, bicycling, street photography, as well as temporary street vendors.

See also
 Welcome Rotonda - a similar roundabout and monument in Quezon City, Metro Manila

References

Cited works
  
 

Buildings and structures completed in 1962
Monuments and memorials in Indonesia
Post-independence architecture of Indonesia
Buildings and structures in Jakarta
Central Jakarta